Andrei Vladimirovich Prokhorov (born 28 September 1965) is a former Russian professional footballer.

Club career
He made his professional debut in the Soviet Second League in 1983 for FC Dynamo Leningrad. He played one game in the UEFA Cup 1994–95 for FC Tekstilshchik Kamyshin.

References

1965 births
Living people
Soviet footballers
Russian footballers
Association football defenders
Russian Premier League players
FC Spartak Tambov players
FC Tekstilshchik Kamyshin players
FC Lada-Tolyatti players
FC Fakel Voronezh players
FC Dynamo Saint Petersburg players